Abbeyleix St Lazerians is a Gaelic Athletic Association club in Abbeyleix, County Laois, Ireland. The club grounds are called Fr Breen Park and the club colours are Primrose and Blue.

History
The club plays at senior level in hurling and has also won eight Laois Senior Football Championship titles, last of which came in 1919.

Hurling is the main game in the club and Abbeyleix holds 8 Laois Senior Hurling Championship titles, the last of which came in 1949.

In 2006, a number of Abbeyleix players were part of the Ballyroan Gaels squad that won the Laois Senior Football Championship. Ballyroan Gaels was an amalgamation of the two neighbouring clubs, Abbeyleix and Ballyroan.

Abbeyleix won the 2007 Laois Intermediate Hurling Championship and returned to the senior grade in 2008.

Achievements
 Laois Senior Hurling Championships (8) 1927, 1932, 1934, 1939, 1940, 1944, 1945, 1949
 Laois Intermediate Hurling Championship 2007

Notable players

Patrick Lalor
Arty Ring
Eugene Fennelly, hurled for Laois
Paddy Brennan
Paddy Kelly

References

External links
Official Abbeyleix GAA Club website

Gaelic games clubs in County Laois
Hurling clubs in County Laois
Gaelic football clubs in County Laois